The Mimic is an 2020 American comedy film, written and directed by Thomas F. Mazziotti. It stars Thomas Sadoski, Jake Robinson, Austin Pendleton, Gina Gershon, Marilu Henner, Tammy Blanchard, Didi Conn, Josh Pais, Jessica Keenan Wynn, M. Emmet Walsh and Jessica Walter in her final film role.

It had its world premiere at the Cinequest Film Festival on March 7, 2020. It was released on February 5, 2021, by Gravitas Ventures.

Plot
A man suspects his friend may be a sociopath and goes to extreme lengths to uncover the truth about him.

Cast
 Thomas Sadoski as The Narrator
 Jake Robinson as The Kid
 Austin Pendleton as The Driver
 Gina Gershon as The Woman at the Bar
 Marilu Henner as The Assistant Editor
 Tammy Blanchard as The Young Woman
 Didi Conn as The Gossip Lady
 Josh Pais as The Neurotic Lawyer
 Jessica Keenan Wynn as The Librarian 
 M. Emmet Walsh as The Director
 Jessica Walter as The Editor
 Matthew Maher as The Waiter/Bartender
 Doug Plaut as The Writer

Release
The film had its world premiere at the Cinequest Film Festival on March 7, 2020. In December 2020, Gravitas Ventures acquired distribution rights to the film, and set it for a February 5, 2021, release.

Reception
The Mimic holds a 64% approval rating on Rotten Tomatoes, based on 22 reviews.

References

External links
 
 

2020 films
American comedy films
American independent films
2020s English-language films
2020s American films